Diego Figueiredo (born 1980) (pronounced fig-a-ray-doe) is a Grammy-nominated Brazilian jazz guitarist.

Biography

Figueiredo began playing music at a young age, going through a number of different instruments before finally choosing guitar at age 12. He was playing at pubs and nightclubs by 15, both with groups and as a solo musician. He released his first album at 17.

Discography

Diego Figueiredo Group (1999)
Segundas  Intenções (2004)
El Colibri (2005)
Autêntico (2006)
Solo (2007)
Hojas Secas (2007)
New Patterns (2007)
Ao Vivo (2007)
Standards (2007)
Dadaiô (2008)
Smile (2009)
Brazilian Accent (2009)
Vivência (2009)
Vale de Lobos (2010)
Just the two of us (2010)
Zibididi (2011)
Tempos Bons (2012)
Chorinho (2014)
The best of Diego Figueiredo I (2014)
Duô (2015)
The Best of Diego Figueiredo II (2015)
Broken Bossa (2015)
Violões Contemporâneos (2017)
Organic (2019)
Come Closer  (2019)
Amizade  (2019)
Compilation  (2020)
Antarctica  (2021)

References

External links
 

Brazilian jazz guitarists
Living people
1980 births
People from Franca
Arbors Records artists
Venus Records artists
Stunt Records artists